Santa María de los Ángeles is a town and municipality, in Jalisco in central-western Mexico. The municipality covers an area of 284.94 km².

As of 2005, the municipality had a total population of 3687.

References

Municipalities of Jalisco